The canton of Sissonne is a former administrative division in northern France. It was disbanded following the French canton reorganisation which came into effect in March 2015. It consisted of 20 communes, which joined the new canton of Villeneuve-sur-Aisne in 2015. It had 10,657 inhabitants (2012).

The canton comprised the following communes:

Boncourt
Bucy-lès-Pierrepont
Chivres-en-Laonnois
Coucy-lès-Eppes
Courtrizy-et-Fussigny
Ébouleau
Gizy
Goudelancourt-lès-Pierrepont
Lappion
Liesse-Notre-Dame
Mâchecourt
Marchais
Mauregny-en-Haye
Missy-lès-Pierrepont
Montaigu
Nizy-le-Comte
Saint-Erme-Outre-et-Ramecourt
Sainte-Preuve
La Selve
Sissonne

Demographics

See also
Cantons of the Aisne department

References

Former cantons of Aisne
2015 disestablishments in France
States and territories disestablished in 2015